In geometry, the elongated triangular bipyramid (or dipyramid) or triakis triangular prism is one of the Johnson solids, convex polyhedra whose faces are regular polygons. As the name suggests, it can be constructed by elongating a triangular bipyramid by inserting a triangular prism between its congruent halves.

The nirrosula, an African musical instrument woven out of strips of plant leaves, is made in the form of a series of elongated bipyramids with non-equilateral triangles as the faces of their end caps.

Formulae
The following formulae for volume,  surface area and height can be used if all faces are regular, with edge length a:

Dual polyhedron 

The dual of the elongated triangular bipyramid is called a triangular bifrustum and has 8 faces: 6 trapezoidal and 2 triangular.

References

External links 
 

Johnson solids
Pyramids and bipyramids